Thomas O'Melia may refer to:

Thomas A. O'Melia (1898–1973), American missionary to China
Thomas O. Melia (born 1957), American politician